Richard B. Russell State Park is a 2,508 acre (10.15 km2) state park located on the shore of Richard B. Russell Lake in Elbert County, Georgia. The park features the 18-hole Arrowhead Golf Course, as well as picnic shelters and a swimming beach.

Facilities
2,508 Acres 
28 Tent, Trailer, RV Campsites  – cable TV hookups 
17 Cottages  
Lake and Swimming Beach 
Rowing Area 
3 Picnic Shelters  
Group Shelter  
18-Hole Arrowhead Pointe Golf Course and Pro Shop
27-Hole Disc Golf Course

1996 Summer Olympics
  The town of Elberton, Georgia and Elbert County contributed to the 1996 Summer Olympics by developing a facility to train at Lake Russell for athletes from Canada, the Czech Republic, Ireland, Japan, Moldavia, New Zealand, Russia, Sweden and the United States. Walter McNeely spear-headed the effort and was an Olympic Torchbearer in the 1996 Summer Olympics torch relay. A Pavilion at the Park is named in his memory.

References

External links
Georgia State Parks

State parks of Georgia (U.S. state)
Protected areas of Elbert County, Georgia
Olympic torch relays